Leonard 'Lenny' Quesnelle is a Canadian ice hockey former player and head coach who is most well known for his long tenure with the men's program at Princeton.

Career
Quesnelle started his college career with Princeton in 1984, playing for the ice hockey team for four seasons. After graduating in 1988 he stayed on as an assistant with the program and served in that capacity for the next twelve years. When Don Cahoon left to take the position at Massachusetts in 2000 Quesnelle was selected as his successor.

In his first two seasons leading the program Quesnelle's Tigers finished with subpar records but no worse than Princeton faithful were used to seeing. Beginning in his third campaign the team took a downturn, finishing dead-last in the conference with a 3-win season. The following year started off much better but the team went winless after December 16 and finished in last place for a second year in a row. Shortly after the season ended Quesnelle was fired, ending his 20-year career at Princeton.

Quesnelle joined his former boss as an assistant at Massachusetts the following season and worked for the Minutemen for nine years. After Cahoon retired in 2012 Quesnelle was still under contract for a year so he stayed on under the new regime before leaving in 2013.

After leaving UMass Quesnelle was hired by the Detroit Red Wings as an amateur scout for the New England area.

Personal
As of 2017, Quesnelle resided in Sunderland, Massachusetts with his wife and two daughters.

College Head Coaching record

References

External links

1966 births
Living people
Sportspeople from Brampton
Ice hockey people from Ontario
Princeton Tigers men's ice hockey players
Princeton Tigers men's ice hockey coaches
Detroit Red Wings scouts
Canadian ice hockey defencemen